Gréta Arn (born 13 April 1979) is a Hungarian retired tennis player of Danube Swabian German descent.

She has won two titles on the WTA Tour, the 2007 Estoril Open in Portugal, and the 2011 ASB Classic in Auckland, New Zealand, as well as four ITF titles in singles. She reached her career-high singles ranking of world No. 40 on 16 May 2011. She has picked up wins against Mary Pierce at the 2002 Acura Classic and Maria Sharapova at the 2011 ASB Classic.

Personal life
Arn was born in Budapest, Hungary. After playing for Germany with dual Hungarian citizenship for nine years, she chose for the 2008 Fed Cup to compete for Hungary alongside Ágnes Szávay. She also chose to play for her nation of birth full-time.

Career

In 1997, Arn won her first title on the ITF Women's Circuit, winning a $10k event at Stockholm. In 1999, she won her second ITF title at the $10k event at Glasgow. In 2004, at Bad Saulgau, she won her third $10k title.

In 2006, Arn won a $25k event in Fort Walton Beach. In 2007, she won her first title on the WTA Tour as a qualifier ranked No. 176 in the world, becoming the lowest ranked and first qualifier to win a WTA event in 2007. In the Tier IV 2007 Estoril Open final she defeated teenager Victoria Azarenka, saving two matchpoints at 4–5 in the third set.

At the 2010 Wimbledon Championships, Arn qualified and reached the third round of a Grand Slam tournament for the first time at the age of 31. In the first round, she beat 34th seed Kateryna Bondarenko before following it up with a win over former top-10 player Alicia Molik. Her run was ended by 2007 Wimbledon finalist Marion Bartoli in the third round. At the 2010 US Open, Arn was pitted against second seeded defending champion Kim Clijsters. She lost in straight sets. Arn qualified for the WTA Premier tournament in Tokyo, by defeating Chan Yung-jan and Elena Baltacha. In the main draw she then defeated fellow qualifier Laura Robson in the first round before losing to top seed Caroline Wozniacki.

In her first event of 2011, at the ASB Classic in Auckland, New Zealand, Arn beat Zuzana Ondrášková. Arn then defeated eighth seed Sofia Arvidsson, saving five match points along the way. She followed it up with the biggest win of her career by defeating top seed and former world No. 1 Maria Sharapova. Arn won her semifinal match against fourth seed Julia Görges in straight sets to book a final berth against defending champion and second seed Yanina Wickmayer for the title. Arn went on to defeat Wickmayer in straight sets to become the 2011 ASB Classic champion and add her second title win.

At the 2012 Australian Open, Arn defeated Rebecca Marino in the first round. In the second round, she won a very tight battle against 17th seed Dominika Cibulková to make her second Grand Slam third round appearance and set up an encounter with Serena Williams, to whom she lost in straight sets. Seeded sixth at the Monterrey Open in February, she advanced to the semifinals before losing to Alexandra Cadanțu.

Arn announced her retirement in January 2014 after no longer being active since the 2013 Wimbledon Championships where she lost in the first round of qualifying.

Almost four years later, at the age of 38, Arn made a comeback on the ITF Circuit. In September 2017, she reached the final of an 25k event in Balatonboglár, Hungary, losing to top-seed Polona Hercog.

Arn's retirement was again announced in January 2021.

Grand Slam performance timelines

Singles

Doubles

WTA career finals

Singles:2 (2 titles)

ITF finals

Singles: 9 (5 titles, 4 runner–ups)

Doubles (4–9)

References

External links

 
 
 

1979 births
Living people
Tennis players from Budapest
German female tennis players
Danube-Swabian people
Hungarian female tennis players
Hungarian people of German descent
Tennis players at the 2008 Summer Olympics
Olympic tennis players of Hungary